Chachacomani (possibly from Quechua chachakuma a medical plant) is a mountain in the Cordillera Real of the Andes Mountains, east of Lake Titicaca in Bolivia.

It is situated in the La Paz Department, Larecaja Province, Guanay Municipality, southeast of Chearoco. Some of the nearest mountains are Wari Umaña in the southwest and Qillwani in the northwest.

Notably, the deep and sheltered valleys around the mountain produce many distinct microclimates, which form lakes and other formations that support many species of birds.

Elevation 
It has an official height of 6074 meters. Other data from available digital elevation models: SRTM yields 6038 metres, ASTER 6043 metres and TanDEM-X 6084 metres. The height of the nearest key col is 5479 meters, leading to a topographic prominence of 595 meters. Chachacomani is considered a Mountain according to the Dominance System  and its dominance is 9.8%. Its parent peak is Chearoko and the Topographic isolation is 4.3 kilometers.

First Ascent 
Chachacomani was first climbed by F. Fritz, F. Buchholtz (Germany) G. Moller, D. Doore, I. Paz and G. Sanjinez (Bolivia) 08th January 1947.

See also 
 Qalsata
 Q'asiri

References

External links

Mountains of La Paz Department (Bolivia)
Mountains of Bolivia
Six-thousanders of the Andes